Sankarpur is a village development committee in Kanchanpur District in Sudurpashchim Province of south-western Nepal. At the time of the 1991 Nepal census it had a population of 6538.

References

Populated places in Kanchanpur District